Interstate 35 (I-35) is a north–south Interstate Highway in the United States that runs from Laredo, Texas, to Duluth, Minnesota. In Iowa, the highway runs from south to north through the center of the state, roughly parallel to U.S. Highway 69 (US 69) and US 65. It enters the state near Lamoni from Missouri and continues north through the southern Iowa drift plain. In the Des Moines area, I-35 runs concurrently with I-80, and the two highways bypass Des Moines to the west and north. I-235, the only auxiliary route of I-35, serves the suburbs and downtown Des Moines; it begins and ends at the two interchanges where I-35 and I-80 meet. Near Mason City and Clear Lake, US 18 and Iowa Highway 27 (Iowa 27) overlap with I-35. Shortly after, US 18 splits off to the west in Clear Lake, while Iowa 27 runs with I-35 until they reach the Minnesota state line.

Construction of I-35 in Iowa took place over 17 years. The first  section of the route that stretched from Cumming to Urbandale was opened on September 21, 1958. In the next 14 years, new sections of the route opened regularly, only leaving the section between Mason City and US 20 uncompleted. On November 14, 1975, the last  section of the route was completed and connected the two noncontiguous sections of I-35.

Route description

Southern Iowa
I-35 enters Iowa at the Missouri state line near the town of Lamoni. An interchange that provides access to the adjacent US 69 and East 100th Street is situated over the state border. The highway travels to the north-northeast for  until it again meets US 69 on the eastern edge of Lamoni. North of Lamoni is a rest area which overlooks the Grand River and provides pedestrian access to Decatur County's Slip Bluff County Park. North of the Grand River, the Interstate straightens to a north–south alignment. Near Decatur City, it intersects Iowa 2 at a diamond interchange. Continuing north, the Interstate slightly eases to the east. Two rural interchanges, for County Road J20 (CR J20) and CR H45/Elk Street, and another in Van Wert for CR J14/East Line Street dot the  separating Decatur City and Osceola.

The Osceola area is served by three interchanges for I-35. The first is a partial cloverleaf interchange with US 34. This junction is so configured because of US 34's proximity to the BNSF Railway line, which carries Amtrak's California Zephyr. The next exit for CR H33/Kansas Street serves a casino and western Osceola. Northwest of Osceola is the western end of Iowa 152, which connects I-35 and US 69 at a narrow point between the two routes. Further north, the small towns of New Virginia, Truro, and St. Charles are each served by an interchange. The Iowa 92 exit just east of Bevington connects I-35 to the larger communities of Winterset and Indianola, to the west and east, respectively. The interchange for Cumming is the last before the Interstate enters the Des Moines metropolitan area.

Central Iowa

I-35 continues north, enters the Des Moines metropolitan area, and meets the Iowa 5 freeway in West Des Moines at exit 68. Further on in West Des Moines, at the West Mixmaster Interchange, I-35 meets I-80 and I-235. I-235 serves downtown Des Moines, while I-35 and I-80 overlap and serve the Des Moines's western and northern suburbs using I-80's exit numbering. On the Clive–Urbandale city border, I-35 and I-80 meet US 6/Hickman Road. Further north in Urbandale, they meet Iowa 141/Northwest Urbandale Drive/Southeast Grimes Boulevard and turn eastward. They also meet US 69/Northeast 14th Street north of Des Moines. Between Des Moines and Ankeny, at the East Mixmaster interchange, I-35 and I-80 separate at an interchange where they also meet I-235.

I-35 then turns north to go through Ankeny. It continues north and at Ames meets US 30. Ames is also served by the Interstate 35 Business Loop (I-35 BL). I-35 continues north and meets Iowa 175 near Ellsworth and meets the US 20 freeway near the community of Williams. It continues north until the Wright County line, where it turns northeast. On this northeasterly alignment, I-35 meets Iowa 3.

Northern Iowa

Shortly after meeting Iowa 3, I-35 turns north again and meets both US 18 and Iowa 27 near Clear Lake at exit 190. I-35 overlaps US 18 and Iowa 27 through the Clear Lake area, which is also served with I-35 BL. US 18 separates in Clear Lake at exit 194, and I-35 and Iowa 27, which serves as the designation in Iowa for the Avenue of the Saints, overlap for the rest of the way to the Minnesota border, meeting Iowa 9 near Hanlontown at exit 203.

Services

The Iowa Department of Transportation (Iowa DOT) operates 37 rest areas and one scenic overlook in 20 locations along its  of Interstate Highway. Along I-35, there are five locations that have facilities accessible to each direction of traffic. A sixth is under construction in northern Polk County. Parking areas are divided so passenger automobiles are separated from large trucks. Common among all of the rest stops are separate men's and women's restrooms, payphones with TDD capabilities, weather reporting kiosks, vending machines, and free wireless Internet. Many stations have family restrooms and dump stations for recreational vehicles.

The first rest areas along Iowa's Interstates were built in the 1960s. They were modest facilities; separate buildings housed the restrooms and vending machines. A few rest stops had another building with local tourist information. The newer facilities feature one large building housing as many as 28 more toilets than the older buildings, in addition to all the other common rest area amenities. They also feature artwork by local Iowa artists. Each new rest area is designed around a theme. For instance, the facility near Story City celebrates the history of transportation in the state. Story County is the home of Iowa DOT and the location where the historic Lincoln Highway and I-35 intersect.

History
The first section of I-35, a  stretch from Cumming to Urbandale, opened around September 21, 1958.

By 1972, I-35 was completed at the Missouri and Minnesota state lines. In southern Iowa, the last section, from Iowa 2 near Decatur City to the state line, was completed on December 2, 1970. In northern Iowa, the section from Iowa 9 near Hanlontown to the state line opened on December 12, 1972. The last section of I-35 to open, from US 20 to Mason City, opened on November 14, 1975.

Exit list

See also

80/35 Music Festival

References

External links

 Iowa
35
Transportation in Decatur County, Iowa
Transportation in Clarke County, Iowa
Transportation in Warren County, Iowa
Transportation in Polk County, Iowa
Transportation in Story County, Iowa
Transportation in Hamilton County, Iowa
Transportation in Wright County, Iowa
Transportation in Franklin County, Iowa
Transportation in Cerro Gordo County, Iowa
Transportation in Worth County, Iowa